Luis A. Atilano (born May 10, 1985) is a Puerto Rican former professional baseball pitcher. He played in Major League Baseball (MLB) for the Washington Nationals.

Career
Selected by the Atlanta Braves in the first round of the 2003 amateur draft, Atilano was traded to the Washington Nationals on August 31, 2006, for veteran utilityman Daryle Ward.

Atilano spent the beginning of the 2006 season pitching for the Myrtle Beach Pelicans of the high A-level Carolina League, where he accrued a win–loss record of 6–7 and an ERA of 4.50 in 18 starts and 1 relief appearance. After struggling at the beginning of the season, he went 3–0 with a 2.89 ERA in July. He pitched two complete games for Myrtle Beach during 2006, but an elbow injury suffered in early August ended his season.

Atilano was recalled from Triple-A Syracuse, by the Nationals, to replace injured Jason Marquis on April 22, 2010. He allowed one run on five hits in a 5–1 Nationals victory against the Los Angeles Dodgers on April 23, 2010, his first major league start and first major league win.  He started off the season well, going 5–1 in his first six decisions—which included consecutive victories over Tim Lincecum and Roy Oswalt.  But then he fell to 6–7 with a 5.15 ERA, and underwent surgery in July to remove bone chips in his elbow. At the start of Spring Training in February 2011, he was designated for assignment and removed from the 40-man roster.

On December 9, 2011, he signed a minor league contract with the Cincinnati Reds, and he played for their organization through the 2012 season. Atilano lives in San Juan, Puerto Rico.

See also
 List of Major League Baseball players from Puerto Rico

References

External links

1985 births
Living people
People from Santurce, Puerto Rico
Major League Baseball players from Puerto Rico
Major League Baseball pitchers
Washington Nationals players
Gulf Coast Braves players
Danville Braves players
Rome Braves players
Myrtle Beach Pelicans players
Gulf Coast Nationals players
Hagerstown Suns players
Potomac Nationals players
Harrisburg Senators players
Syracuse Chiefs players
Pensacola Blue Wahoos players
Louisville Bats players
Criollos de Caguas players
Liga de Béisbol Profesional Roberto Clemente pitchers